Ouargla District is a district in Ouargla Province, Algeria. It was named after its capital, Ouargla, which is also the capital of the province. According to the 2008 census, the total population of the district was 191,136 inhabitants.

Communes
The district is further divided into two communes:
Ouargla
Rouissat
Both communes form part of Ouargla's urban area.

References

Districts of Ouargla Province